Großröda is a village and a former municipality in the district Altenburger Land, in Thuringia, Germany.  Since 1 January 2012, it is part of the municipality Starkenberg.

References

Former municipalities in Thuringia
Duchy of Saxe-Altenburg